Classic Loire Atlantique is a road bicycle race held annually in the French department of Loire-Atlantique. Since 2011, it is organized as a 1.1 event on the UCI Europe Tour, after upgrading from category 1.2.

Winners

External links
 
 2009 Classic Loire Atlantique

Cycle races in France
UCI Europe Tour races
Recurring sporting events established in 2000
2000 establishments in France